Paul & Paula (Ray Hildebrand, born December 21, 1940, and Jill Jackson, born May 20, 1942) are a former American pop singing duo, best known for their 1963 million-selling, number-one hit record, "Hey Paula".

Biography
Hildebrand was born in Joshua, Texas, and Jackson in McCamey, Texas.  Both were attending Howard Payne College (now called Howard Payne University) in Brownwood, Texas, in 1962, when a local disc jockey, Riney Jordan, of station KEAN, asked listeners to come to the studio and sing their songs to help the American Cancer Society. The duo sang a song called "Hey Paula," which Hildebrand wrote; the lyrics were inspired by a friend of his, Russell Berry, whose fiancée was named Paula. Jordan decided that Hildebrand and Jackson should record the song, and they did. 

Shelby Singleton of Philips Records eventually signed the two, but not before changing their professional names (Singleton reasoned that a pair named Ray and Jill singing about "Hey, hey Paula" and "Hey, hey Paul" did not make sense). "Hey Paula" sold over two million copies globally, and was awarded a gold disc by the Recording Industry Association of America  in 1963.

The duo released two regular albums and a Christmas-themed album after the success of "Hey Paula", which charted at number one on the Billboard Hot 100 for the entire month of February 1963.  Their follow-up, "Young Lovers", reached number six on the Billboard chart later in the same year.
 
In 1963, American Bandstand signed Paul & Paula to Dick Clark's Caravan of Stars national U.S. tour, which was scheduled to perform its 15th show on the night of November 22, 1963, at the Memorial Auditorium in Dallas, until suddenly the Friday evening event had to be cancelled after U.S. President John F. Kennedy was assassinated that afternoon.
 
In 1965, Hildebrand left the act to complete his college education, having decided that a future in show business was not for him. He made this decision in the middle of another Dick Clark Caravan of Stars road trip, and Clark had to fill in at the last minute. Hildebrand recorded a Christian music album in 1967 called He's Everything to Me. He became best-known among Christian music fans for his 1970s hit song "Anybody Here Wanna Live Forever?" Subsequently, Hildebrand joined up with another Christian performer, Paul Land, and during the 1980s and 1990s, they performed comedy and Christian music under the name of Land & Hildebrand.   

Jackson went on with a solo career, and then married a Los Angeles businessman named Marvin Landon. Since their days as a singing duo, Jill and Ray have remained friends, and well into the early 2000s, they occasionally would get together to sing as Paul & Paula for special events, such as oldies shows. In 2002, Hildebrand and Jackson returned to Howard Payne University in Brownwood, TX, where they were the homecoming guests of honor and grand marshals.

Discography

Albums

Singles

See also 
 List of Billboard Hot 100 number ones of 1963

References

American musical duos
American pop music groups
Charay Records artists
Musical groups disestablished in 1965
Musical groups from Texas
Philips Records artists